Sabana Grande is a Caracas Metro station on Line 1. It was opened on 27 March 1983 as part of the extension of Line 1 from La Hoyada to Chacaíto. The station is between Plaza Venezuela and Chacaíto.

The name of the station is derived from the quarter of Sabana Grande.

References

Caracas Metro stations
1983 establishments in Venezuela
Railway stations opened in 1983